The women's shot put at the 2021 World Athletics U20 Championships was held at the Kasarani Stadium on 21 August.

Records

Results

Final
The final was held on 21 August at 16:40.

References

Shot put
Shot put at the World Athletics U20 Championships
U20